Sar Mur (also Romanized as Sar Mūr, Sar Mowr, and Sarmūr) is a village in Qarah Chaman Rural District, Arzhan District, Shiraz County, Fars Province, Iran. At the 2006 census, its population was 214, in 37 families.

References 

Populated places in Shiraz County